Marilyn Sitzman (December 14, 1939 – August 11, 1993) was an American receptionist and a witness to the assassination of United States President John F. Kennedy in Dallas, Texas, on November 22, 1963. She was with her boss, Abraham Zapruder, as he made the Zapruder film, the most studied record of the assassination.

Early years
Sitzman was born in Lafayette, Colorado and attended the University of Colorado at Boulder before moving to Dallas. After moving to Dallas, Sitzman got a job as a receptionist at dress manufacturer Abraham Zapruder's clothing company Jennifer Juniors.

Witness to JFK's assassination
Zapruder's clothing company was located in the Dal-Tex Building at 501 Elm Street, one block from Dealey Plaza through which the presidential motorcade would be passing on November 22. The Dal-Tex building is located across the street from the Texas School Book Depository. Sitzman's boss, Abraham Zapruder, arrived at work that morning without his 8 mm movie camera as he decided not to film the motorcade because it was raining that morning. By mid-morning, the rain had cleared and Zapruder's secretary Lillian Rogers encouraged him to go home to retrieve his camera to film the motorcade. Zapruder initially decided to film the motorcade from the window of his office but later decided to film from Dealey Plaza as the angle was better. He chose a concrete abutment which extends from a retaining wall that was part of the John Neely Bryan concrete pergola on the grassy knoll north of Elm Street, in Dealey Plaza. Sitzman offered to join Zapruder as he suffered from vertigo and was apprehensive about standing on the abutment unassisted. Sitzman and Zapruder climbed on top of the 4-foot (1.2 m) high pedestal. While Sitzman stood behind Zapruder and held his coat to steady him, he began filming the presidential motorcade as it turned on Houston Street onto Elm Street. The fatal head shot struck President Kennedy as his limousine passed almost directly in front of their position, 65 feet (20 m) from the center of Elm Street.

Sitzman went on record about the direction of the shots she heard, stating that they came from the direction of the Texas School Book Depository. Sitzman rejected the theory that one or more shots came from behind the 5-foot (1.5 m) high stockade fence atop the knoll:

Between Sitzman and the stockade fence was a 3.3-foot (1 m) high, L-shaped concrete alcove along the path from the stairway up the knoll to the area behind the pergola. Some assassination researchers, studying vague shapes in a photograph taken by Mary Moorman from across the street just after the fatal head shot, saw the so-called "badge man" aiming a rifle from this area. Another person, Gordon Arnold, came forth in 1978 to claim that he had been standing in that area taking a film of the motorcade.

Later years and death
In the years following the assassination, Sitzman was interviewed by various researchers and writers. The Warren Commission, a Presidential Commission appointed by President Lyndon B. Johnson to investigate the assassination, never interviewed Sitzman. When later asked why she was never called before the Commission, Sitzman stated, "Because it was [the 1960s], I was female and I was young. And I was irrelevant." On September 24, 1964, the Warren Commission released an 888-page report that concluded there was no evidence of a conspiracy and Lee Harvey Oswald, a former United States Marine that was arrested in connection with the shooting of Dallas Police Officer J.D. Tippit and later became a suspect in the assassination, acted alone in killing President Kennedy and Officer Tippit.

In an interview with researcher Josiah Thompson conducted on November 29, 1966, rediscovered in 1985, Sitzman gave eyewitness testimony to who was in the alcove below her and about nine yards (8.2 m) to her right: a young black couple was sitting on a bench, eating lunch and drinking sodas.  When the shots rang out, the couple ran along the path to the area behind the pergola. Sitzman recalled hearing a soda bottle breaking as they ran.  Asked if she saw anyone else in this area between the concrete wall and the stockade fence, Sitzman said no, only the couple. Over the years, Sitzman continued to maintain that the shots she heard came from the direction of the Texas School Book Depository but added that she believed there was a possibility that there was a second gunman. Sitzman stated, "I have no qualms saying that I'm almost sure that there was someone behind the fence or in that area up there [near the fence], but I'm just as sure that they had silencers because there was no sound."

Sitzman died of cancer on August 11, 1993 at age 53 in Mesquite, Texas.

In popular culture
Sitzman was portrayed by Lynne Rostochil in Oliver Stone's 1991 film JFK and by Bitsie Tulloch in Peter Landesman's 2013 film Parkland.

References

External links
 Marilyn Sitzman reenacts her position for Life magazine.
 Marilyn Sitzman on the set of JFK in 1991.
 View of stockade fence from Sitzman's position.
 Martin Shackelford, R.I.P.: The Black Dog Man. Includes quotes from a 1992 interview with Sitzman.

1939 births
1993 deaths
Deaths from cancer in Texas
People from Lafayette, Colorado
People from Dallas
University of Colorado Boulder alumni
Witnesses to the assassination of John F. Kennedy